The 4th Missouri Infantry Regiment was an infantry regiment that served in the Union Army during the American Civil War.

Service
The 4th Missouri Infantry Regiment was organized at St. Louis, Missouri and mustered for three years in January 1862. It was established though the consolidation of the 3rd United States Reserve Corps Infantry Regiment, which was largely composed of German immigrants, and the Gasconade Battalion.

On duty at the District of Southwest Missouri and St. Louis.

Detailed service
On duty at Pacific, Missouri and St. Louis.

The 4th Missouri Infantry was mustered out of service on February 1, 1863.

See also

 Missouri Civil War Union units
 Missouri in the Civil War

Notes

References
 Dyer, Frederick H. A Compendium of the War of the Rebellion (Des Moines, IA:  Dyer Pub. Co.), 1908.
 

Military units and formations established in 1862
Military units and formations disestablished in 1863
Units and formations of the Union Army from Missouri
1862 establishments in Missouri